The 2015 Red Bull Air Race World Championship was the tenth Red Bull Air Race World Championship series, contested over eight events in seven countries held between February and October.

British pilot Paul Bonhomme won his third world title by five points, after winning half of the eight races. His closest challenger was Australian pilot Matt Hall, and the pair finished well clear at the top of the championship. Bonhomme won the opening two races of the season in Abu Dhabi and Chiba, before an eighth-place finish – his worst result of the season – in Rovinj, saw Hall tie his points tally with three podium finishes. After Austria's Hannes Arch won in Rovinj and Budapest, Bonhomme and Hall shared the remaining victories between them; Bonhomme won at Ascot and Fort Worth, while Hall took his first Air Race victories at the Red Bull Ring and Las Vegas Motor Speedway. Arch completed the championship podium, some 42 points in arrears of Bonhomme.

The series also maintained the Challenger Cup format that was introduced for the 2014 season, for young pilots to develop their skills. Each pilot entered at least five races in order to accrue points towards the Cup rankings, with the top six pilots after the Fort Worth event being invited to a winner-takes-all event at Las Vegas Motor Speedway. Mikaël Brageot of France – who had topped the Cup rankings – won the race by 0.035 seconds over Peter Podlunšek, to take the title.

Aircraft and pilots

Master Class

 Entering
 Challenger Class competitors François Le Vot and Juan Velarde, who were fourth and eighth respectively in 2014, joined the Master Class.

Challenger Class

 All Challenger Cup Pilots used an Extra 330LX.

Race calendar and results

The eight-event calendar for the 2015 season was announced on 25 November 2014. An updated race calendar was released on 3 March 2015, which dropped the round in Sochi, Russia and the round in Rovinj, Croatia returned to the calendar.

Championship standings

Master Class

Master Class scoring system

Challenger Class
As in 2014, Challenger Class pilots had to compete in at least three races throughout the season, with each pilot's best three scores counting towards the Challenger Cup ranking. The top six pilots in the ranking qualified for a winner-takes-all race at the end of the season.

Challenger Class scoring system

Ranking

Final

At the last race of the season at Las Vegas, the top six pilots in the standings took part in a race to determine the final ranking of the Challenger Cup.

References

External links

 

 
Red Bull Air Race World Championship seasons
Red Bull Air Race
Red Bull Air Race